The following is a list of things named after the famed Bernoulli family of Basel.

 Bernoulli differential equation
 Bernoulli distribution
 Bernoulli number
 Bernoulli polynomials
 Bernoulli process
Bernoulli Society for Mathematical Statistics and Probability
 Bernoulli trial
 Bernoulli's principle
 Bernoulli's triangle
Rue Bernoulli in Paris 8 - Rue Bernoulli in Paris 8 was named rue Bernouilli in 1867 and renamed to the correct spelling in 1994
Bernoulli crater - Spelled Bernouilli in the moon atlas by Beer & Mädler (1836), and hence adopted as the official name by the IAU in 1935; the IAU changed the official name to Bernoulli in 2003
French submarine Bernouilli

Daniel Bernoulli
Bernoulli Box
Bernoulli grip
Bernoulli principle
Euler—Bernoulli beam equation

Jakob Bernoulli

Bernoulli differential equation
Bernoulli numbers
Poly-Bernoulli number
Bernoulli's formula
Bernoulli polynomials
Bernoulli map
Bernoulli operator
Hidden Bernoulli model
Time-inhomogeneous hidden Bernoulli model
Bernoulli sampling
Bernoulli distribution
Continuous Bernoulli distribution
Generalized Bernoulli distribution
Bernoulli trial
Bernoulli process
Bernoulli scheme
Bernoulli random variable
Bernoulli's Golden Theorem (Law of Large numbers) 
Bernoulli's inequality
Lemniscate of Bernoulli

Johann Bernoulli
Bernoulli's rule, see L'Hopital's rule
Bernoulli's identity, see Sophomore's dream

See also
Bernoulli (disambiguation)

 Bernoulli family